Rainer Hanschke (born 22 December 1951 in Finsterwalde) is a German former gymnast who competed in the 1976 Summer Olympics.

References

1951 births
Living people
German male artistic gymnasts
Olympic gymnasts of East Germany
Gymnasts at the 1976 Summer Olympics
Olympic bronze medalists for East Germany
Olympic medalists in gymnastics
Medalists at the 1976 Summer Olympics
Medalists at the World Artistic Gymnastics Championships
People from Finsterwalde
Sportspeople from Brandenburg
20th-century German people
21st-century German people